Buckeye is an unincorporated community in Milton Township, Jackson County, Ohio, United States.

Buckeye was founded as a company town for the local Buckeye Furnace, built around 1850 and listed on the National Register of Historic Places in 1975.  Another local site on the list is the Buckeye Furnace Covered Bridge.

References 

Unincorporated communities in Jackson County, Ohio